On Top of the World is the third studio album by American hip hop duo Eightball & MJG. The album was released on October 31, 1995, by Suave House Records and Relativity Records. West-coast artists E-40 and Mac Mall both make appearances on this album, along with Big Mike – a one-time member of Geto Boys. Nuckle Heads, a newly formed group of 2 female rappers on Suave House, debut on this album. South Circle (Mr. Mike and Thorough) also make an appearance here. Former 1 of the Girls member Nina Creque also appears on the album.

The album cover was designed by Houston based company Pen & Pixel Graphics, who also designed the cover for their 1993 debut Comin' Out Hard. The company would later be known for their covers for No Limit Records as well as Cash Money Records.

Track listing

Personnel
 DJ Squeeky - scratches
 Tony Draper - executive producer, production coordinator
 Roger Tausz - recording engineer, mixing
 John Moran - mastering
 Pen & Pixel - artwork, design, layout, special effects

Charts

Weekly charts

Year-end charts

References

1995 albums
8Ball & MJG albums
G-funk albums